Through 1924, the French Championships were open only to French nationals or members of specific French clubs. Beginning in 1925, the French Championships were open to all nationalities.

The table is set out as follows: (Female partner) & (Male partner).

Champions

French Championships

French Open

Statistics

Champions by country

If the doubles partners are from the same country then that country gets two titles instead of one, while if they are from different countries then each country will get one title apiece.

Notes

References

See also

French Open other competitions
List of French Open men's singles champions
List of French Open men's doubles champions 
List of French Open women's singles champions
List of French Open women's doubles champions

Grand Slam mixed doubles
List of Australian Open mixed doubles champions
List of Wimbledon mixed doubles champions
List of US Open mixed doubles champions
List of Grand Slam mixed doubles champions

mix
French Open
French Open